Kim Jung-eun (born 7 September 1987) is a South Korean basketball player. She competed in the women's tournament at the 2008 Summer Olympics and the 2020 Summer Olympics.

References

External links

1987 births
Living people
South Korean women's basketball players
Olympic basketball players of South Korea
Basketball players at the 2008 Summer Olympics
Basketball players at the 2020 Summer Olympics
People from Cheonan
Forwards (basketball)
Asian Games medalists in basketball
Asian Games gold medalists for South Korea
Basketball players at the 2006 Asian Games
Basketball players at the 2014 Asian Games
Medalists at the 2014 Asian Games
Sportspeople from South Chungcheong Province